Mian Aminuddin (Punjabi) was a civil servant in the Indian Civil Service (British India) and the first Mayor of Lahore, Pakistan. He also was the Chief Commissioner of Balochistan between 1949 and 1952.

Early life and career
Mian Aminuddin was among the very few and early Muslim members of the Indian Civil Service (British India).
"At independence Pakistan faced an acute shortage of experienced senior administrators. In the government of undivided India, there were only two Muslim ICS officers and one Muslim Indian Political Service (IPS) officer who had risen to the position of joint secretary, namely Mian Aminuddin (ICS, 1923), Ikramullah Khan (ICS, 1927), and Lieutenant (retired) Iskander Mirza."British Indian Civil Service's Joint Secretary Mian Aminuddin on GoogleBooks Retrieved 16 January 2019

In Pakistan, Mian Aminuddin later served as Governor of Punjab, Pakistan also from 2 May 1953 to 24 June 1954.

See also
Mian family of Baghbanpura

References

Indian Civil Service (British India) officers
Governors of Punjab, Pakistan
Mayors of Lahore
Pakistan Cricket Board Presidents and Chairmen
Pakistani civil servants
People from Lahore
Punjabi people
Mian family